Aydar Igorevich Lisinkov (born 2 January 1994) is a Russian football player.

Club career
He made his debut in the Russian Professional Football League for FC Spartak-2 Moscow on 30 April 2015 in a game against FC Khimki. He made his Russian Football National League debut for Spartak-2 on 1 November 2015 in a game against FC Tosno.

References

External links
 

1994 births
Footballers from Kazan
Living people
Russian footballers
Russia youth international footballers
Russia under-21 international footballers
Association football defenders
FC Vityaz Podolsk players
FC Khimki players
FC Tom Tomsk players
FC Sokol Saratov players
FC Spartak-2 Moscow players